Cyclops is a 2008 television monster film about the mythological cyclops. Here the cyclops is the last survivor of species who once fought the Roman Army and ends up in the Circus Maximus.

Plot
The film is set in Ancient Rome during the reign of Emperor Tiberius. In the countryside, a group of travelers come across some sheep and kill some for food. They are interrupted by their owner, a ferocious cyclops, the last of his kind, which kills them all but one who escapes back to Rome. There he sends word to the Emperor that a cyclops has been sighted. He sends his best commander Marcus Romulus (Kevin Stapleton) to capture the mankiller. Though it costs him some of his men, Marcus succeeds and takes the cyclops back to Rome. Emperor Tiberius needs a new beast for his circus. When he sees how much attention the cyclops attracts, the emperor decides to use him instead of expensive lions.

A group of defiant slaves learn they are about to become cyclops fodder. They flee but in spite of all efforts the fugitives are caught rather soon. Although Marcus leads the contingent which captures them, he is against slavery and argues with the emperor's main consultant Falco (Craig Archibald). The infuriated Tiberius Caesar punishes Marcus for his insubordination by sporting him as a gladiator. Marcus does well in the arena and discovers he can teach the cyclops words and simple ideas while the swift giant is in his cell. Finally, the emperor promises the cyclops freedom in return for killing Marcus. Yet the cyclops decides otherwise and kills the emperor, only to be killed in return by Falco. Marcus avenges the cyclops and becomes the liberator of Rome.

Cast
 Eric Roberts as Emperor Tiberius Caesar
 Kevin Stapleton as Marcus
 Frida Farrell as Barbara
 Craig Archibald as Falco
 Mike Straub as Gordian
 David McFarland as Severus

See also
 Hydra (film)
 Sharktopus

References

External links
 
 
 

2008 television films
2008 films
2000s monster movies
American monster movies
Films based on classical mythology
Films set in ancient Rome
Films set in Rome
Films about gladiatorial combat
Films shot in Bulgaria
Films produced by Roger Corman
Films produced by Julie Corman
Syfy original films
Films set in the 1st century
2000s science fiction horror films
2000s English-language films
Films directed by Declan O'Brien
2000s American films